Reinaldo Ramos Suassuna also known as Mestre Suassuna (pronounced ; born 1938 in Ilhéus, Bahia, Brazil) is the founder and head of the international capoeira organization Cordão de Ouro.


Early life
Suassuna was raised in Itabuna and began practicing capoeira in the early 1950s, initially because it was prescribed to him by a doctor, as treatment for a physical handicap in his legs. He graduated under Masters Sururu, Abine in Itabuna, and later studied under Waldemar, Canjiquinha, and Bimba.

Professional career
In the early 1960s, Suassuna became a prominent practitioner of capoeira in Bahia, receiving numerous invitations to present his capoeira show in other Brazilian states and abroad.  In 1965 he moved to São Paulo with the intention of opening an academy and making a career in capoeira.  In September 1967, after some financial hardship, he met Mestre Brasilia in Ze Freita's Academy, and together they founded Associacao de capoeira Cordão de Ouro.

As Mestre Suassuna, he has produced many capoeira shows, recorded four compact discs, and directed the Show Group of Cordão de Ouro.  He has also contributed to the development of capoeira itself, and is the inventor of Miudinho, which is a musical rhythm, along with a distinct style in the martial art.  Suassuna continues to influence the world of capoeira today, conducting workshops and seminars in several states in Brazil and around the world. He has graduated several capoeiristas individually and 5 distinct group generations known as "turma" (1970, 1975, 1980, 1988 and 2000).

In recent years an investigation and lawsuits from various states of Brazil are conducted against him regarding sexual assault.

Miudinho 
Among Mestre Suassuna's many achievements is the creation and development of the “Miudinho Game” and the respective berimbao rhythm. In 1970s and 1980s capoeira reached the peak of its popularity in Brazil and has rapidly expanded abroad. Not only capoeira was recognized as a martial art it was also included in the curriculum of educational institutions, while newly opened schools of capoeira provided occupation for young people especially from disadvantaged families. But such a rapid development came at a price as capoeira play became more aggressive.

Meanwhile Master Suassuna, concerned with the direction that capoeira had been taking, made an effort to revive and capoeira play used to play in 1950s. He focused on the artistic side of capoeira, paying great attention to mobility and technique of movement, and included more elaborated movements into basic training sequences. The new style called "miudinho" ("choosy" in Portuguese) has the form of continuous play in a cramped space (jogo de dentro) with a lot of swings and floreos. Miudinho game, developed by mestre Suassuna, is considered as the unique feature of Cordao de Ouro school.

References

Capoeira mestres
Brazilian capoeira practitioners
Martial arts school founders
Living people
1938 births